Trichaetoides divisura is a moth in the family Erebidae first described by Francis Walker in 1862. It is found on Borneo and Sumatra.

References

Syntomini
Moths described in 1862